Anthony Delaplace (born 11 September 1989) is a professional French road cyclist, who currently rides for UCI ProTeam .

Career
Delaplace was a junior champion for France in 2007. He made his Grand Tour debut in the 2011 Tour de France, where he was the youngest rider in the competition, and finished 135th in the general classification.

Delaplace left  at the end of the 2013 season, and joined  for the 2014 season.

Major results

2007
 1st  Road race, National Junior Road Championships
2009
 3rd Road race, National Under-23 Road Championships
 10th Overall Tour du Haut-Anjou
2010
 1st Stage 2 Tour de l'Avenir
 6th Overall Grand Prix du Portugal
 9th Paris–Troyes
2011
 1st Polynormande
 2nd Boucles de l'Aulne
 2nd La Roue Tourangelle
 4th Grand Prix Pino Cerami
 8th Overall Tour de Bretagne
2012
 1st  Young rider classification, Étoile de Bessèges
 2nd Paris–Troyes
 4th Overall Circuit de la Sarthe
 10th Tour du Finistère
2013
 9th Overall Tour du Limousin
1st  Young rider classification
 10th Chrono des Nations
2014
 2nd Duo Normand (with Arnaud Gérard)
 5th Overall Circuit de la Sarthe
 8th Polynormande
 9th Overall Boucles de la Mayenne
1st  Sprints classification
2015
 2nd Grand Prix de la Somme
 3rd Classic Loire Atlantique
 4th Overall Tour de Bretagne
 4th Polynormande
 9th Overall La Tropicale Amissa Bongo
  Combativity award Stage 7 Tour de France
2016
 2nd Overall Boucles de la Mayenne
 2nd Paris–Camembert
 3rd Overall La Tropicale Amissa Bongo
 8th Duo Normand (with Arnaud Gérard)
 9th Overall Étoile de Bessèges
 10th Tour du Doubs
  Combativity award Stage 1 Tour de France
2017
 1st  Overall Tour de Normandie
1st Stage 1
 1st Duo Normand (with Pierre-Luc Périchon)
 3rd La Roue Tourangelle
 6th Overall Giro di Toscana
 9th Chrono des Nations
 10th Overall Tour de l'Ain
 10th Classic Sud-Ardèche
2018
 1st  Mountains classification, Boucles de la Mayenne
 4th Route Adélie
 4th Duo Normand (with Pierre-Luc Périchon)
 7th Coppa Ugo Agostoni
 8th Overall Tour du Jura
 9th Overall Circuit de la Sarthe
2019
 6th Duo Normand (with Thibault Guernalec)
 7th Overall Four Days of Dunkirk
 7th Boucles de l'Aulne
 8th Polynormande
 9th Tro-Bro Léon
 10th Overall Tour du Limousin
2020
 6th Overall Tour du Limousin
 8th Prueba Villafranca de Ordizia
2021
 2nd Overall Tour de Bretagne
 2nd Trofeo Calvia
 6th Overall Tour Poitou-Charentes en Nouvelle-Aquitaine
 9th Classic Loire Atlantique
 10th Prueba Villafranca de Ordizia
 10th Polynormande
2022
 1st Paris–Camembert
 9th Chrono des Nations
 10th Overall Tour de l'Ain
 10th Prueba Villafranca de Ordizia

Grand Tour general classification results timeline

References

External links

Anthony Delaplace profile at Saur-Sojasun

1989 births
Living people
French male cyclists
Sportspeople from Manche
Cyclists from Normandy